Maria José de Castro Polessa (born 22 September 1953), known professionally as Zezé Polessa, is a Brazilian actress.

Biography 
Polessa was born in Rio de Janeiro. She graduated in Medicine from the Faculty of Medicine of the Federal University of Rio de Janeiro in 1977 and she graduated in social medicine, but she changed her profession to that of an actress. She was married to actor Daniel Dantas, father of her only son: João. She later married actor Paulo José.

Filmography

Television

Film

Stage plays

References 

Brazilian television actresses
Actors from Rio de Janeiro (state)
1953 births
Living people
Pages with unreviewed translations